There are five association football sub-continental championships for national team from each sub-continental federation contested every two, three or four years. The governing bodies of five sub-continental confederations are all members of AFC and ultimately part of FIFA, the international association of football governing body.

Men's national team championships

Women's national team championships

See also
Continental football championships
Timeline of association football

References

External links

Asia